Madison Township is one of ten townships in Jefferson County, Indiana, United States. As of the 2010 census, its population was 17,415 and it contained 8,087 housing units.

History
It was one of three townships created when Jefferson County began operation on Feb. 11, 1811. Prior to that, the area was part of Madison Township Clark County. It has the largest population of any of Jefferson County's 10 townships as it includes the city of Madison.

Outside of the City of Madison, the township has the following active churches: Ryker's Ridge Baptist Church, which was founded in 1840, and Wirt Baptist Church, founded in 1818 as Harbert's Creek Baptist Church. Extinct churches in the country include Bee Camp Baptist (1872-ca.1879), Center Presbyterian (1831-ca. 1850), Graysville Methodist (ca. 1837-ca. 1870?), Mt. Zion Methodist (1868–1972), Olive Branch Methodist (1835–1938), Otterbein Chapel United Brethren (1867-after 1916), Ryker's Ridge Presbyterian (1831-ca. 1837)

There is one public school outside of the city, Ryker's Ridge Elementary School. It was originally the Central School, a 1-12 school, which had its first high school graduation in 1878 and last in 1961, when it was consolidated with the Madison system.

The township has two active post offices, Madison and North Madison. Madison was established in 1812 and North Madison on Jan. 13,1848.

Madison has also had the following post offices: Bee Camp, (Feb. 18, 1880-Feb. 15, 1905) China: Madison/Shelby Twp. Jan. 30, 1833-Nov. 29, 1838. Moses H. Wilder; Feb., 3, 1879-May 2, 1881, Feb. 23, 1882-Feb. 28, 1902 (to Madison) postmaster, Jacob Thiennes. The first post office was likely in Madison Twp. The next two renditions were in Shelby Twp. Eagle Springs (Oct. 19, 1868-Dec. 5, 1870); Stoney Point (July 26, 1853 – May 31, 1906); Waldinger (Dec. 30, 1897-Apr. 15, 1902); Wirt (Dec. 22, 1834-June 19, 1839) and (June 24, 1856 – June 30, 1950; Zion  (Sept. 13, 1895–July 15, 1899).

Lemuel Allen Farm and Mathias Wolf Farm were listed on the National Register of Historic Places in 2016.

Geography
The streams of Bee Camp Creek, Big Clifty Creek, Crooked Creek, Deans Branch, Dry Fork, Eagle Hollow Creek, Little Clifty Creek, Little Crooked Creek, Razor's Fork, Schnapps Creek, Turkey Run (usually called Turkey Branch locally), West Fork of the Indian-Kentuck Creek and Wolf Run run through this township.

Cities and towns
 Madison (the county seat)

Extinct towns
 North Madison
 Ringwald
 Wirt
 Wirt Station

Adjacent townships
 Monroe Township (north)
 Shelby Township (northeast)
 Milton Township (east)
 Hanover Township (southwest)
 Republican Township (west)
 Smyrna Township (west)
 Lancaster Township (northwest)

Cemeteries
The township contains these cemeteries: Booth, Craig, Bramwell, Brisbane, Brown-Bacon, Bryner, Fairmount, Graysville (Miller), Higbie, Indiana Veterans Memorial Cemetery, Jewish, Lund, Minor, Monroe, Olive Branch, Olive Branch, Paul, Pleasant Ridge  (Reul), Rykers Ridge Baptist (Old and New), Saint Anthony Roman Catholic, Saint Josephs Roman Catholic, Saint Patricks Roman Catholic, Springdale, Thomas, Underwood, Wirt Baptist and Woodfill.

The Baxter, Bayless, Big Creek, Craig (another Craig Cemetery), Marble Corner, Marble Valley, Monroe and Mt. Monroe cemeteries were relocated to an area just south of Fairmount Cemetery in 1941  when the former Jefferson Proving Ground was created. Bayless was originally in the northern part of the township. The Baxter, Big Creek, Marble Valley, Monroe and Mt. Monroe cemeteries had been in Monroe Township. Marble Corner was relocated from Shelby Township, Ripley County. Some graves from St. Magdalene cemetery were moved from the original site in the same township to St. Patrick's cemetery. The Lund family cemetery, originally located near the Ohio River was moved to the Bayless Cemetery about 1951 during the construction of the Indiana-Kentucky Electric Corp. power plant. Many of the graves in the Old Third Street Cemetery in  downtown Madison relocated to Fairmount Cemetery on the Madison hilltop in the 1800s.

Major highways
  U.S. Route 421
  Indiana State Road 7
  Indiana State Road 56
  Indiana State Road 62

Airports and landing strips
 Madison Municipal Airport

References
 U.S. Board on Geographic Names (GNIS)
 United States Census Bureau cartographic boundary files

Baker, J. David, The Postal History of Indiana, 1976, Philatelic Bibliophile, P.O. Box 213971, Louisville, Ky. 1976.
Gresham, John M. & Co., 1889. Biographical & Historical Souvenir for the Counties of Clark, Crawford, Harrison, Floyd, Jefferson, Jennings, Scott and Washington.

External links
 Indiana Township Association
 United Township Association of Indiana

Townships in Jefferson County, Indiana
Townships in Indiana